Turkey has qualified send athletes to the 2016 Summer Paralympics in Rio de Janeiro, Brazil, from 7 September to 18 September 2016.  Sports the country qualified to compete in include 5-a-side football, archery, goalball and wheelchair basketball.

Medalists

| width=20% align=left valign=top |

| width=70% align=left valign=top |

Competitors

| width=78% align=left valign=top |
The following is the list of number of competitors participating in the Games:

Disability classifications

Every participant at the Paralympics has their disability grouped into one of five disability categories; amputation, the condition may be congenital or sustained through injury or illness; cerebral palsy; wheelchair athletes, there is often overlap between this and other categories; visual impairment, including blindness; Les autres, any physical disability that does not fall strictly under one of the other categories, for example dwarfism or multiple sclerosis. Each Paralympic sport then has its own classifications, dependent upon the specific physical demands of competition. Events are given a code, made of numbers and letters, describing the type of event and classification of the athletes competing. Some sports, such as athletics, divide athletes by both the category and severity of their disabilities, other sports, for example swimming, group competitors from different categories together, the only separation being based on the severity of the disability.

Administration and support 
As of January 2016, the country had qualified 37 vision impaired athletes for Rio.  The Games will be the first where Turkey sends teams in all vision impaired team sports.

5-a-side football 

Turkey qualified for the Paralympics after finishing first at the 2015 IBSA Blind Football European Championships.  They made it out of group play in second, with England having won the group after not dropping a game.  Turkey dropped their game against England 1 - 2, with the English side goals coming from Turnham and English while the Turkish goal came from Hasan Şatay.  In elimination play, Şatay and Abdullah Sümer scored two goals in penalty time after their game against Spain ended in 0 - 0 draw.  Turkey then met Russia in the gold medal match, where Kahraman Gurbetoğlu scored to give Turkey a 1 - 0 win.

5th–6th place match

Archery

Turkey qualified three archers for the Rio Games following their performance at the 2015 World Archery Para Championships. The spots are all in the compound open, with 2 spots for men and 1 spot for a woman. Bülent Korkmaz earned Turkey's first spot in the men's compound open, with Erdoğan Aygan earning the second men's spot. Handan Biroğlu earned the women's spot after defeating Ireland's Kerrie-Louise Leonard to qualify for the quarterfinals.

Men

|-
|align=left|Sadık Savaş
|align=left|Individual Recurve Open
|545
|31
|L 2–6
|colspan=5|Did Not Advance
|-
|align=left|Erdoğan Aygan
|align=left rowspan=2|Ind. compound
|663
|17
|W 143–142
|L 137–137
|colspan=4|Did Not Advance
|-
|align=left|Bülent Korkmaz
|687 
|1
|
|W 137–137
|L 138–139
|colspan=3|Did Not Advance
|-
|align=left|Naci Yenier
|align=left rowspan=2|Individual compound W1
|637
|4
|
|W 138–131
|L 128–131
|colspan=3|Did Not Advance
|-
|align=left|Ömer Aşık
|648 
|1
|
|
|L 124–130
|colspan=3|Did Not Advance
|}

Women

|-
|align=left|Zehra Özbey Torun
|align=left rowspan=2|Individual Recurve Open
|582
|14
|W 6–4
|W 6–2
|L 3–7
|colspan=2|Did Not Advance
|5
|-
|align=left|Merve Nur Eroğlu
|603
|9
|L 2–6
|colspan=5|Did Not Advance
|-
|align=left|Handan Biroğlu
|align=left|Ind. compound
|648
|8
|
|W 139–137
|L 132–144
|colspan=2|Did Not Advance
|5
|}

Mixed

|-
|align=left|Sadık SavaşMerve Nur Eroğlu
|align=left|Team Recurve Open
|1148
|10
|
|L 3–5
|colspan=3|Did Not Advance
|9
|-
|align=left|Bülent KorkmazHandan Biroğlu
|align=left|Team Compound Open
|1335
|3
|
|
|W 147–145
|L 139–149
|L 128–138
|4
|}

Athletics

Men
Track events

Field events

Women
Track events

Field events

Goalball

Men 
Turkey's men enter the tournament ranked fourth in the world.

Pool B

Quarter-Finals

Women 
The Turkey women's national goalball team qualified for the Rio Games after finishing third at the 2014 IBSA Goalball World Championships.  They defeated Japan in the bronze medal game to qualify.  Turkey's assistant coach Eren Yıldırım said after his team qualified, "We had a nightmare in the semi-final against Russia (a 2-1 defeat). But our main aim was a place at Rio 2016 and we managed to recuperate and focus on this. We’re really pleased.” Turkey's women enter the tournament ranked fifth in the world.

Pool D

Quarter-Finals

Semi-Finals

Final

Judo

Powerlifting

Women

Shooting 

The first opportunity to qualify for shooting at the Rio Games took place at the 2014 IPC Shooting World Championships in Suhl. Shooters earned spots for their NPC.  Turkey earned a qualifying spot at this event in the R2 – 10m Air Rifle standing women SH1 event as a result of Çağla Baş winning a silver medal. Cevat Karagöl gave Turkey another spot in the P1 – 10m Air Pistol Men SH1  event after winning a bronze medal.

The country sent shooters to 2015 IPC Shooting World Cup in Osijek, Croatia, where Rio direct qualification was also available.  They earned a qualifying spot at this event based on the performance of Muharrem Korhan Yamaç in the P4 – 50m Pistol Mixed SH1 event.

The third opportunity for direct qualification for shooters to the Rio Paralympics took place at the 2015 IPC Shooting World Cup in Sydney, Australia.  At this competition, Savaş Üstün earned a qualifying spot for their country in the R3 - Mixed 10m Air Rifle Prone SH1 event.

The last direct qualifying event for Rio in shooting took place at the 2015 IPC Shooting World Cup in Fort Benning, USA in November. Ayşegül Pehlivanlar earned a qualifying spot for their country at this competition in the P2 Women's 10m Air Pistol SH1 event. Murat Oğuz earned a second qualifying spot for Turkey at this competition in the P4 Mixed 50m Pistol SH1 event. Because no women qualified in the P3 Mixed 25m Pistol SH1 event, the spot for women was reallocated to P4 Mixed 50m Pistol SH1, which Turkey's Aysel Özgan claimed for her country. Hakan Çevik claimed another spot for Turkey with his performance in the R5 Mixed 10m Air Pistol Prone SH2 event.

Men

Women

Qualification Legend: Q = Qualify for the next round; q = Qualify for the bronze medal (shotgun)

Swimming

Men

Women

Table Tennis

Men's individual

Men's team

Women's individual

Women's team

Wheelchair basketball

The Turkey men's national wheelchair basketball team has qualified for the 2016 Rio Paralympics.

During the draw, Brazil had the choice of which group they wanted to be in.  They were partnered with Spain, who would be in the group Brazil did not select.  Brazil chose Group B, which included  Iran, the United States, Great Britain, Germany and Algeria.  That left Spain in Group A with Australia, Canada, Turkey, the Netherlands and Japan.
Group A

Quarter-Finals

Semi-Finals

3rd Place

Wheelchair tennis 
Busra Un qualified for Rio in the women's singles event as a result of a Bipartite Commission Invitation place.

See also
Turkey at the 2016 Summer Olympics

References

Nations at the 2016 Summer Paralympics
2016
2016 in Turkish sport